Bilina may refer to:

 Bílina, a town in the Czech Republic
 Bílina (river), a river in the Czech Republic
 Bilina, Croatia, a historic settlement in inland Dalmatia, Croatia
 Levocabastine or Bilina, a pharmaceutical drug composition of Levocabastine and other components often used in eye-drops.